Declan Burns (born 26 June 1956) is an Irish sprint canoer who competed from the mid-1970s to the late 1980s. At the 1976 Summer Olympics in Montreal, he was eliminated in the repechages of both the K-2 500 m and the K-4 1000 m events. Four years later in Moscow, Burns was eliminated in the repechages of the K-1 500 m event. At his third and final Summer Olympics in Seoul, he was eliminated in the semifinals of the K-2 1000 m event.

References
 Sports-reference.com profile

1956 births
Canoeists at the 1976 Summer Olympics
Canoeists at the 1980 Summer Olympics
Canoeists at the 1988 Summer Olympics
Irish male canoeists
Living people
Olympic canoeists of Ireland